Astartea cicatricosa is a shrub endemic to Western Australia.

It is found along the south coast in the Goldfields-Esperance regions of Western Australia.

Etymology
The species epithet, cicatricosa, derives from the Latin cicatricosus ("full of scars"), and  refer to the pitting the seeds' surface.

References

Eudicots of Western Australia
cicatricosa
Endemic flora of Western Australia
Plants described in 2013
Taxa named by Barbara Lynette Rye
Taxa named by Malcolm Eric Trudgen